Peter McNamara and Paul McNamee defeated the defending champions Peter Fleming and John McEnroe in the final, 6–3, 6–2 to win the gentlemen's doubles title at the 1982 Wimbledon Championships.

Seeds

  Peter Fleming /  John McEnroe (final)
  Sherwood Stewart /  Ferdi Taygan (semifinals)
  Peter McNamara /  Paul McNamee (champions)
  Kevin Curren /  Steve Denton (semifinals)
 n/a
  Bob Lutz /  Stan Smith (second round)
  Mark Edmondson /  Kim Warwick (quarterfinals)
  Pavel Složil /  Tomáš Šmíd (first round)
  Victor Amaya /  Hank Pfister (third round)
  Anders Järryd /  Hans Simonsson (second round)
  Fritz Buehning /  Peter Rennert (second round)
  Sandy Mayer /  Frew McMillan (third round)
  Bruce Manson /  Brian Teacher (first round)
  Tim Gullikson /  Tom Gullikson (first round)
  Johan Kriek /  Larry Stefanki (second round)
 n/a

Draw

Finals

Top half

Section 1

Section 2

Bottom half

Section 3

Section 4

References

External links

1982 Wimbledon Championships – Men's draws and results at the International Tennis Federation

Men's Doubles
Wimbledon Championship by year – Men's doubles